Digama culta is a moth of the  family Erebidae. It is found in South Africa.

References

External links 
 Species info

Aganainae
Moths of Africa
Moths described in 1852